Jorge Larena-Avellaneda Roig (born 29 September 1981), known as Larena, is a Spanish former professional footballer who played usually as an attacking midfielder.

He played 193 La Liga matches over seven seasons (15 goals), in representation of three teams, mainly Las Palmas for which he also appeared in Segunda División. He also spent five years in the Cypriot First Division at the service of AEK Larnaca.

Club career
Larena was born in Las Palmas, Canary Islands. A product of hometown club UD Las Palmas' youth ranks, he played one game for the first team in the 1999–2000 season as they returned to La Liga after an absence of 12 years, and was first choice the following two top-flight campaigns, suffering relegation in the second after scoring seven goals from 36 matches. He made his debut in the competition on 23 September 2000, six days before his 19th birthday, in a 1–1 home draw against Real Valladolid.

In summer 2002, Larena signed for Atlético Madrid, being regularly played by the Colchoneros over three seasons but rarely as a starter (37 appearances in that condition). Subsequently, he joined fellow league side RC Celta de Vigo, being relegated at the end of 2006–07. He scored six times the following year, but the Galicians nearly dropped down another level.

On 16 July 2008, Larena returned to his native region and Las Palmas, agreeing to a three-year contract with the Segunda División club. He made his official debut on 30 August, playing the full 1–0 loss at Real Sociedad.

Larena appeared in only 13 matches (617 minutes of action) in 2010–11, and did not have his contract renewed. After being released by Las Palmas he went on trial at Football League One's AFC Bournemouth and Greenock Morton in the Scottish Football League First Division, but nothing came of it and he eventually signed for SD Huesca.

Having joined in 2014 at the age of 33, Larena then spent several seasons in the Cypriot First Division with AEK Larnaca FC, sharing teams with a host of compatriots.

Career statistics

Honours
AEK Larnaca
Cypriot Cup: 2017–18
Cypriot Super Cup: 2018

References

External links

1981 births
Living people
Spanish footballers
Footballers from Las Palmas
Association football midfielders
La Liga players
Segunda División players
Tercera División players
UD Las Palmas Atlético players
UD Las Palmas players
Atlético Madrid footballers
RC Celta de Vigo players
SD Huesca footballers
Recreativo de Huelva players
Cypriot First Division players
AEK Larnaca FC players
Spain under-21 international footballers
Spanish expatriate footballers
Expatriate footballers in Cyprus
Spanish expatriate sportspeople in Cyprus